The 1957 All-Big Seven Conference football team consists of American football players chosen by various organizations for All-Big Seven Conference teams for the 1957 NCAA University Division football season.  The selectors for the 1957 season included the Associated Press (AP) and the United Press (UP).  Players selected as first-team players by both the AP and UP are designated in bold.

All-Big Eight selections

Backs
 Dwight Nichols, Iowa State (AP-1)
 Bob Stransky, Colorado (AP-1)
 Clendon Thomas, Oklahoma (AP-1) (College Football Hall of Fame)
 Henry Kuhlman, Missouri (AP-1)

Ends
 Don Zadnik, Kansas State (AP-1)
 Jim Leteavila, Kansas (AP-1)

Tackles
 Jack Keelan, Kansas State (AP-1)
 John Wooten, Colorado (AP-1)

Guards
 Bill Krisher, Oklahoma (AP-1)
 Charles Rash, Missouri (AP-1)

Centers
 Bob Harrison, Oklahoma (AP-1)

Key
AP = Associated Press

UP = United Press

See also
1957 College Football All-America Team

References

All-Big Seven Conference football team
All-Big Eight Conference football teams